Gimli may refer to:

 Gimli, Manitoba, Canada
 Rural Municipality of Gimli, Manitoba, Canada
 Gimli (electoral district), a provincial electoral district in Manitoba
 RCAF Station Gimli (1943–1971), former air force station near the town
 Gimli Industrial Park Airport, current airport using part of the former air station
 Gimli Glider, a famous emergency airplane landing at the former air station
 Gimli (Middle-earth), a fictional character in The Lord of the Rings
 Gimli (mountain), a mountain in British Columbia
 Gimli Peak, a mountain in Valhalla Provincial Park
 Gimli (cipher), a cryptographic permutation suitable for use in a sponge function

See also
 Gimlé, a "heaven" in Norse mythology
 Gimli Glider, nickname of a plane that landed in Gimli after running out of fuel